Nick Galifianakis may refer to:

Nick Galifianakis (politician) (born 1928), American congressman
Nick Galifianakis (cartoonist), American cartoonist and artist, nephew of the politician